The women's 1000 metres race of the 2015 World Single Distance Speed Skating Championships was held on 13 February 2015.

Results
The race was started at 18:00.

References

Women's 1000 metres
World